AJ Mediratta (born Ajata Mediratta but known professionally as AJ Mediratta) is an American investor who has worked in financial markets, particularly in fixed income emerging markets and in sovereign debt restructurings. He is a co-president at Greylock Capital Management, LLC (Greylock Capital), an alternative asset investment adviser. Mediratta is active in Greylock Capital's investment activity and debt restructuring efforts globally, with a focus on sovereign and quasi-sovereign restructuring activity in Latin America and the Caribbean.

Biography

Early life
Mediratta was born in Buffalo, New York and spent his childhood in Huntington, New York. He graduated from the Choate Rosemary Hall school in 1983 and enrolled at Williams College where he completed a Bachelor of Arts degree in economics in 1987 and an MBA in Finance and International Business from Columbia Business School in 1992.

Professional career
Following Williams College, Mediratta worked for the Export–Import Bank of the United States in Washington DC before enrolling at Columbia Business School.  He received a master's degree from Columbia University and began a career in investment banking, working successively for The Weston Group,  Credit Lyonnais Securities and Bear Stearns. Mediratta joined Greylock Capital upon the conclusion of Bear Stearns' merger with JP Morgan.

Mediratta chaired the creditor committee for an investor group working to restructure a large portion of the outstanding $544 million USD sovereign debt of the nation of Belize. The Belize sovereign debt restructuring was noteworthy because it demonstrated how sovereign borrowers and commercial creditors can reach an amicable agreement without recourse to lawsuits. For this and for several other innovations in the deal, the Belize restructuring deal was awarded Latin Finance's 2013 Deal of the Year in the Restructuring category.

Mediratta chaired the creditor committee restructuring the $220 million USD debt of Panama's Trump Ocean Club Project. He also represented Greylock Capital on the $193.5 million USD sovereign debt restructuring of the nation of Grenada.  The Grenada deal was considered an innovative sovereign restructuring because it offered debt relief for the nation while also allowing creditors to participate in revenue growth.  He also co-chaired the October 2019 restructuring of 7bn USD in Barbados sovereign debt. Both the Grenada and Barbados restructurings included hurricane clauses which permit payment relief in the event of future natural disasters.

Mr. Mediratta currently represents Greylock Capital as part of a creditor committee formed to negotiate a restructuring of Suriname's $675 million USD in loans. With significant discussion remaining in the restructuring, Mr. Mediratta expressed the committee's willingness to work with Suriname as the nation proposed a payment deferral plan.

Personal
Mediratta sits on the Board of Directors of the UTCNorth American Fund of the Unit Trust Corporation, a financial services company operating in Trinidad and Tobago. Mediratta is married and lives in Manhattan with his wife and three children.

References

External links
 Greylock Capital website
UTCNorth American Fund
Unit Trust Corporation

American investors
Living people
Columbia Business School alumni
Williams College alumni
Year of birth missing (living people)
Choate Rosemary Hall alumni